The Anglo-Iraqi Treaty of October 1922 was an agreement signed between the British and Iraqi governments. The treaty was designed to allow for Iraqi self-government while giving the British control of Iraq's foreign policy. It was intended to conclude an agreement made at the Cairo Conference of 1921 to establish a Hashemite Kingdom in Iraq.

In the aftermath of the First World War, the former possessions of the Ottoman Empire were divided between France and Britain, with the remainder becoming the present-day country of Turkey. The former Ottoman provinces of Baghdad, Mosul, and Basra were proposed to become a League of Nations Class A mandate under direct British rule, known as the British Mandate for Mesopotamia. The general public in the region reacted negatively to the mandate, resenting the imposition of British control; this led to the Iraqi revolt of 1920, which caused the British to instead decide that the mandate territories would instead become the Kingdom of Iraq. On 23 August 1921, Faisal ibn Hasayn was crowned as Faisal I, King of Iraq.

Concurrently, the area acquired by the new kingdom was going through a period of political turmoil. Nationalists who believed that the expulsion of the Ottomans would lead to greater independence were disappointed at the system of government decided for the British Mandate of Mesopotamia. Rather than the people of the region gaining a new sense of national identity through self-government, the British imported civil servants from India who had previous knowledge and experience of how to manage the administration of an overseas possession.

The Anglo-Iraqi Treaty of 1922 served to prevent uprisings in the intended new Kingdom of Iraq by giving Britain direct control of the kingdom's military, and significant influence over its economic and political affairs.

The Sykes-Picot Agreement

During the First World War, the Sykes–Picot Agreement was struck between the foreign ministers of Great Britain and France on behalf of their respective governments on a vision of a post war division of the Ottoman Empire in which the Arab provinces of the Ottoman Empire (south and west of Anatolia) would be split into spheres of influence for the French and British. That France and Great Britain are prepared to recognize and protect an independent Arab states or a confederation of Arab states (a) and (b) marked on the annexed map, under the suzerainty of an Arab chief. That in area (a) France, and in area (b) Great Britain, shall have priority of right of enterprise and local loans. That in area (a) France, and in area (b) Great Britain, shall alone supply advisers or foreign functionaries at the request of the Arab state or confederation of Arab states.

Insurgency
The Anglo-Iraqi Treaty was signed due mostly to the strenuous efforts of the people of the former Ottoman provinces, a coalition of both Sunni and Shia Arabs. Major centres of insurgency during what was later called the "Great Iraqi Revolution" of 1920 included, Baghdad, Najaf, and Karbala. The insurgency effort in Karbala was inflamed by a fatwa issued by the grand mujtahid, Imam Shirazi. This fatwa made the observation that it was contrary to the principles of Islam for the region to be ruled by the British, who did not practice Islam. The fatwa ordered a jihad against the British forces of occupation.

The Kurds of the northern part of the region also waged war against the British in the years following the signing and ratification of the treaty. They sought separation from newly created Iraq, aiming to establish a separate homeland for themselves. Their efforts at revolt were tempered by the British, in large part due to air-to-ground attacks conducted by the Royal Air Force, but the aid of other Kurds to defeat the revolt were of significant consequence.

The Cairo Conference
The Cairo Conference of 1921 would set the stage for greater Iraqi autonomy. The British appointed Faisal ibn Hasayn to lead the country as the first King of Iraq. Faisal was seen as a compromise between British interests in the country, and the revolutionary nationalists; he could trace his family lineage back to the Prophet Muhammad, as well as having participated in the 1916 Arab revolt against the Ottomans. For their part, the British saw Faisal as a dependable ally which would aid them in accomplishing their imperial goals.

The Signing
The treaty was controversial in Great Britain because of a very strong ‘Quit Mesopotamia; (or 'Quit Iraq)’ movement. If Iraq did not ratify, Britain might have withdrawn from Iraq. The key player in obtaining the support was High Commissioner, Sir Henry Dobbs. He took full advantage of distance to make decisions and act in line with his own, not London’s approach. The treaty was signed on behalf of the British by Sir Percy Cox on 10 October 1922. However, it was not ratified by the Iraqi government until 1924. It was only when the Dobbs threatened to wield his authority to scrap the constitution, drafted by the Iraqi constituent assembly, that the treaty was finally ratified. It was seen with disdain by many of the people of the new Kingdom, both Sunni and Shia. While it was the first step towards complete independence from the imperial powers.

Suspension
The Treaty was eventually suspended upon the signing of the Anglo-Iraqi Treaty of 1930.

See also
 Anglo-French Declaration
 Anglo-Iraqi Treaty (1930)
 British-Iraqi relations
 British Mandate of Mesopotamia
 RAF Iraq Command
 Faisal I of Iraq
 Iraq
 Mesopotamia

Notes

This article contains material from the Library of Congress Country Studies, which are United States government publications in the public domain.

References and sources
The History Guy  accessed on 13 April 2008.
Encyclopaedia of the Orient  accessed on 9 August 2007.
Chronological Table of Middle East History  accessed on 9 September 2007.
Encyclopædia Britannica 
 Wilks, Ann. "The 1922 Anglo-Iraq Treaty: A Moment of Crisis and the Role of Britain’s Man on the Ground." British Journal of Middle Eastern Studies 43.3 (2016): 342-359.

This article uses an image reproduced from http://www.passia.org with permission (Mahmoud Abu Rumieleh, Webmaster).

Treaties of Mandatory Iraq
Treaties of the United Kingdom (1801–1922)
Interwar-period treaties
Treaties concluded in 1922
Treaties entered into force in 1924
Iraq–United Kingdom relations
Sykes–Picot Agreement
Bilateral treaties of the United Kingdom